Turjan in Iran may refer to:
 Turjan, Isfahan
 Turjan, Kurdistan